Jagdish Raj Sahni was an Indian politician from Bharatiya Janata Party. Sahni was elected as a member of the Punjab Legislative Assembly from Batala (constituency) in 1992, 1997 and 2007. Sahni defeated Ashwani Sekhri of Indian National Congress by 46 votes in 2007 Punjab Assembly election. Sahni died from cardiac arrest aged 77.

References 

1944 births
2021 deaths
21st-century Indian politicians
People from Gurdaspur district
Bharatiya Janata Party politicians from Punjab
Punjab, India MLAs 1992–1997
Punjab, India MLAs 1997–2002
Punjab, India MLAs 2002–2007